Artem Serhiyovych Starhorodskyi (born 17 January 1982) is a professional Ukrainian footballer, who plays as a midfielder.

International career
On 2 July 2009 he scored a tying goal for Ukraine in the game against the Czech Republic at the 2009 Summer Universiade in Serbia.

External links
 
 
 

1982 births
Living people
Footballers from Kyiv
Ukrainian footballers
Ukraine student international footballers
Association football midfielders
Ukrainian Premier League players
Ukrainian expatriate footballers
Expatriate footballers in Belarus
Ukrainian expatriate sportspeople in Belarus
FC Dynamo-3 Kyiv players
FC Dynamo-2 Kyiv players
FC Systema-Boreks Borodianka players
FC Naftovyk-Ukrnafta Okhtyrka players
SC Tavriya Simferopol players
FC Krymteplytsia Molodizhne players
FC Arsenal Kyiv players
FC Chornomorets Odesa players
FC Shakhtyor Soligorsk players
FC Vitebsk players
FC Livyi Bereh Kyiv players
Universiade gold medalists for Ukraine
Universiade medalists in football
Medalists at the 2007 Summer Universiade